This paleoentomology list records new  fossil insect taxa that were described during the year 2014, as well as notes other significant paleoentomology discoveries and events which occurred during that year.

Clade Amphiesmenoptera

Trichoptera

Clade Antliophora

Diptera

Mecoptera

Clade Archaeorthoptera

†Cnemidolestida

Orthopterans

Other archaeorthopterans

Clade Coleopterida

Coleoptera

Clade Dictyoptera

Blattodea

Mantodea

Hemiptera

Hymenoptera

Clade Neuropterida

Neuroptera

Raphidioptera

Odonata

Other insects

References

2014 in paleontology
Paleoentomology
2014-related lists